Suq (also romanized as Sūq) is a city in the Suq District of Kohgiluyeh County, Kohgiluyeh and Boyer-Ahmad Province, Iran. At the 2006 census, its population was 5,890, in 1,190 families.

References

Populated places in Kohgiluyeh County

Cities in Kohgiluyeh and Boyer-Ahmad Province